Longmire may refer to:

 Longmire (surname)
 Longmire, Washington, a historic district in Mount Rainier National Park, Washington, United States
 Longmire Buildings, historic buildings in the district
 The Walt Longmire Mysteries, series of novels by Craig Johnson
 Walt Longmire, the titular character of the Walt Longmire mysteries novels
 Longmire (TV series), a TV series based on the novels by Craig Johnson
 35197 Longmire, an asteroid

See also
 Longmire Campground Comfort Stations